WAEC (860 kHz) is an AM radio station in Atlanta, Georgia, broadcasting a Christian talk format. The station is owned by Beasley Broadcast Group, Inc., through licensee Beasley Media Group, LLC, and is known on-air as "Love 860".

The station's programming features a wide variety of local and national ministries including J. Vernon McGee, Albert Pendarvis, Ken Hagin and local pastors. WAEC also broadcasts health, lifestyle, and entertainment programs.

Originally a 1,000-watt daytime-only station, in the mid-1980s WAEC increased power to 5,000 watts, then was licensed for a 24-hour signal with 500 watts during nighttime hours and 2,500 watts during critical hours. The station uses a non-directional antenna during daytime and critical hours, and a directional antenna system at night. The broadcast towers are located near the Flat Shoals Road exit of Interstate 20 in Atlanta.

History

WERD

WERD was the first radio station owned and operated by African Americans. The station was established in Atlanta, Georgia in 1948. Though WDIA in Memphis was on the air a year earlier carrying black-oriented programming, the station was not owned by African Americans.

Jesse B. Blayton Sr., an accountant, bank president, and Atlanta University professor, purchased WERD in 1949 for $50,000. He changed the station format to "black appeal" and hired his son Jesse Jr. as station manager. "Jockey" Jack Gibson was hired soon after, and by 1951 was the most popular DJ in Atlanta. The station was housed in the Masonic building on Auburn Avenue, then one of the wealthiest black neighborhoods in the United States. Located in that same building was the headquarters of the new Southern Christian Leadership Conference, led by Martin Luther King Jr. It has been said that King would beat the roof of the office with a broomstick as a signal to send the microphone down when he wanted to make public addresses.

Blayton sold the station in 1968, and in 1969 its call letters were changed to WXAP.

WAEC
The station briefly changed to country music in the late 1970s under new owner, Mike Sears, before becoming WAEC on December 3, 1978. The first station to play contemporary Christian music in Atlanta, its new call letters stood for "Atlanta's Electric Church".

Don Stone was hired as general manager a year later and changed the slogan to "Love 86". Stone built the station to be one of the most successful Christian stations in the country, and created several publications for the station including the Atlanta Christian Business Directory and the Love 86 Express newspaper. Stone stayed at the station until 1994, when he departed to focus on publishing the Atlanta Christian Business Directory and The Love 86 Express, now Atlanta Christian Magazine.

Sears sold the station to Tampa-based Forus Communications in 1982, who sold the station 20 years later to Beasley Broadcasting.

References

External links
Official WAEC "Love 860" Website

FCC History Cards for WAEC

AEC
Radio stations established in 1969
1969 establishments in Georgia (U.S. state)
AEC
AEC